Ashley Blaker is a British comedian and television producer.  Blaker is a writer for TV and radio and a longtime collaborator with Matt Lucas: he was producer of Little Britain and Rock Profile. He also co-created and wrote The Matt Lucas Awards, and appeared in one episode. Lucas, amongst others, has described Blaker as "the UK's only Orthodox comedian".

As a stand-up comedian, Blaker’s first Off-Broadway show, Strictly Unorthodox, opened in May 2017 at The Theater Center. and his second Off-Broadway show, Goy Friendly opened in February 2020, at the SoHo Playhouse.

Early life

Blaker was educated at the Haberdashers' Aske's Boys' School, where he was four years behind Sacha Baron Cohen, and a friend of Matt Lucas, with whom he went on to create Little Britain. He is a graduate of both Oxford and Cambridge. He embraced Orthodox Judaism in his early twenties.

Career

As a producer
Having completed a BBC course, Blaker had started work with them as a trainee radio producer. An unexpected encounter in the street in 1999 with his old school friend Lucas proved a turning point for them both. Lucas had pitched the idea of Little Britain to the controller of BBC 2, Jane Root. Blaker suggested turning it into a radio show and despite the initial reticence of Lucas' writing partner David Walliams, they decided to press ahead. The show launched in 2000, and Blaker produced two series on the radio before the show switched to TV in 2003.

With Little Britain under way, the same group collaborated on Rock Profile. The first series was broadcast in 1999, comprising 13 episodes, on digital channel UK Play and subsequent series appeared on BBC Two. 

From 2012-13, Blaker was producer, as well as co-creator and co-writer (with Matt Lucas) of The Matt Lucas Awards, a BBC TV show in which Blaker appeared on-screen in one episode.

As a comedian
In 2017, he was commissioned by the BBC to create a show called Ashley Blaker's Goyish Guide To Judaism, described as "an insider's view of his religion"". It was broadcast in June 2018 as part of BBC Radio Four's Stand-Up Specials series. A follow-up was commissioned and broadcast in 2019.

Blaker's stand-up show, Observant Jew, was part of the 2018 Edinburgh Festival Fringe.

In 2019, he performed a UK tour titled Prophet Sharing in tandem with Muslim comedian Imran Yusuf.

In August 2020, a new four-part series 6.5 Children was commissioned from Blaker by BBC Radio 4; broadcast started in July 2021.

Critical reception
His material has been described by the New York Times as being different from most other Jewish comics': "In contrast to most overtly Jewish comedy, which usually compares Jews and gentiles, most of his material juxtaposes the frum and not frum." The paper's review described him as "a skilled joke-teller with none of the borscht belt timing you would expect from a Catskills comic. And since we rarely hear the perspective of the ultra-Orthodox in comedy clubs, there’s a pleasing freshness about an act that offers a look into a world often hidden from public view."

Bibliography

References

Living people
Year of birth missing (living people)

British comedians
Contestants on University Challenge
Jewish English comedians
English Ashkenazi Jews
English Orthodox Jews
English Jewish writers
People educated at Haberdashers' Boys' School
Alumni of Keble College, Oxford
Alumni of the University of Cambridge